The Houston Heights Waterworks Reservoir, located at West 20th Street and Nicolson Street in Houston, Texas, was listed on the National Register of Historic Places on June 22, 1983.

See also
 National Register of Historic Places listings in Harris County, Texas

References

1893 establishments in Texas
Buildings and structures completed in 1893
Industrial buildings and structures on the National Register of Historic Places in Texas
National Register of Historic Places in Houston
Water supply infrastructure on the National Register of Historic Places